The Copa General Pedro Ramírez (officially named Campeonato de la República) was an Argentine official football cup competition organized by the Argentine Football Association. The trophy was named after being donated by then de facto President of Argentina, General Pedro Ramírez.

The first edition was contested by 35 teams from Primera División teams and others from regional leagues.

The format was a group stage where teams directly affiliated to the Association competed each other, while the best placed teams of regional leagues competed in other groups. All games were played at neutral venues.

From the quarterfinals, a total of eight teams from both groups (four directly affiliated and four from the regional leagues) faced in a knock-out tournament until a champion was crowned.

For the third and last edition of 1945, a record of 42 teams contested the tournament.

Champions

Finals

Topscorers 
Source:

References

P